Tig n' Seek (originally called Tiggle Winks) is an American animated television series created by Myke Chilian for Cartoon Network. Prior to the series, he served as a designer on Rick and Morty as well as a writer and artist on Uncle Grandpa. The series is produced by Cartoon Network Studios. It was originally set to premiere on Cartoon Network, but was moved to the then-upcoming streaming service, HBO Max. The first season premiered on July 23, 2020 on the streaming service. The series was renewed for a second season which premiered on March 11, 2021. The series made its linear premiere on Cartoon Network on August 6, 2021, with some episodes aired out of order. The third season was released on September 16, 2021, only six months after the show's second season premiered. The fourth season was released on May 26, 2022. The show also was the last to feature the voice of Louie Anderson before his death on January 21, 2022. On August 18, 2022, the series was removed from HBO Max.

Premise
Tig n' Seek follows the adventures of Tiggy, an 8-year-old detective, and his cat Gweeseek as they solve cases and retrieve lost items at the Department of Lost & Found.

Cast

Main cast
 Myke Chilian as Tiggy
 Jemaine Clement as This Guy
 Rich Fulcher as Boss
 Wanda Sykes as Nuritza
 Vatche Panos as Prangle Penguin
 Kari Wahlgren as Gweeseek (pilot)

Supporting cast
 Maryann Strossner as Mrs. Grendelsons
 Vartui Rosie Chilian as Rosie Penguin
 Grey DeLisle as Carla Tetrazzini
 Louie Anderson as Chester
 Kayla Melikian as Skippy

Guest stars
 Kate Freund as Linda Buckles
 James Adomian as H. G. Fluffenfold
 Sam Jay as Captain Delilah
 Zach Hadel as Darryl Barryl

Episodes

Series overview

Season 1 (2020)

Season 2 (2021)

Season 3 (2021)

Season 4 (2022)

Production
The show was originally part of the Cartoon Network Shorts Program in 2015, before being greenlight for a series in May 2019. Rough Draft Studios handles most of the animation for the series, which is done through traditional animation techniques at the studio in Seoul, South Korea. The series premiered on July 23, 2020.

International broadcast
In Canada, the series premiered on Teletoon on November 8, 2020.

References

External links
  (archived)
 
 Tig n Seek Online

2020 American television series debuts
2020s American animated television series
2022 American television series endings
American children's animated adventure television series
American children's animated comedy television series
Animated television series about children
Television series by Cartoon Network Studios
Cartoon Network original programming
English-language television shows
HBO Max original programming
Television series set on fictional islands